KWVE may refer to:

 KWVE-FM, a radio station (107.9 FM) licensed to San Clemente, California, United States
 KGSV, a radio station (660 AM) licensed to Oildale, California, United States, which held the call sign KWVE from 2009 to 2016